Anitha is a given name. Notable people with the name include:

Anitha Kumaraswamy, Indian politician
Anitha R. Radhakrishnan (born 1952), Indian politician
Anitha Shaiq, Indian playback singer
S. Anitha (2000–2017), student

See also
Anitha, a synonym of the moth genus Polypogon (moth)